Freetown is an unincorporated community and census-designated place in Pershing Township, Jackson County, Indiana, United States. As of the 2010 census the population was 385.

History
Freetown was platted in 1850. A post office was established at Freetown in 1850.

The Frank Wheeler Hotel was listed on the National Register of Historic Places in 1991.

Geography
It is bordered to the west by Hoosier National Forest. Indiana State Road 135 passes through the west side of the community, leading north  to Gnaw Bone and south  to Brownstown, the Jackson county seat. State Road 58 passes through the west and north sides of the community, leading northeast  to Columbus and southwest  to Bedford.

Demographics

References

Census-designated places in Indiana
Census-designated places in Jackson County, Indiana